The 2010–11 season was the 131st season of competitive football in England.

The season began on 6 August 2010 for the Football Leagues, with the Premier League and Football Conference both starting eight days later on 14 August 2010. The Championship, League One, and League Two ended on 7 May 2011. The Premier League finished on 22 May 2011.

Promotion and relegation
Teams promoted to Premier League
Newcastle United
West Bromwich Albion
Blackpool

Teams relegated from Premier League
Hull City
Burnley
Portsmouth

Teams promoted to Championship
Norwich City
Leeds United
Millwall

Teams relegated from Championship
 Sheffield Wednesday
 Plymouth Argyle
 Peterborough United

Teams promoted to League One
 Notts County
 Rochdale
 Bournemouth
 Dagenham & Redbridge

Teams relegated from League One
 Gillingham
 Wycombe Wanderers
 Southend United
 Stockport County

Teams promoted to League Two
 Stevenage
 Oxford United

Teams relegated from League Two
 Grimsby Town
 Darlington

Managerial changes

Diary of the season

July 2010
1 July 2010: Roy Hodgson signs a three-year contract to manage Liverpool, a month after Rafael Benítez left.

2 July 2010: Israeli winger Yossi Benayoun joins Chelsea from Liverpool for an undisclosed fee. Ivorian midfielder Yaya Touré joins Manchester City for a fee of "about £24 million" from Barcelona.

7 July 2010: Leicester City appoint Swansea City's Paulo Sousa as manager to replace Nigel Pearson, who moved to Hull City at the end of June.

8 July 2010: Sunderland captain and Albanian international midfielder Lorik Cana departs to Galatasaray of Turkey for £5 million, after one season at the Stadium of Light.

9 July 2010: Sheffield United reject an approach from Swansea City for assistant manager Gary Speed to take over as manager of the south Wales club.

14 July 2010: Los Angeles Galaxy winger David Beckham rules out taking over as England manager in the future, but declares his desire to play at Euro 2012 and the 2014 World Cup. Manchester City sign Spanish winger David Silva from Valencia for £24 million.

16 July 2010: Trevor Brooking urges the Football Association to appoint an English successor when Fabio Capello eventually departs from the role of England manager. Former Watford and Reading manager Brendan Rodgers is appointed as Swansea City's new manager. Manchester City sign Lazio and Serbia left-back Aleksandar Kolarov for £16 million.

19 July 2010: English international midfielder Joe Cole signs a four-year deal with Liverpool, following the expiry of his contract at Chelsea in June.

22 July 2010: Aston Villa manager Martin O'Neill announces that he is willing sell to midfielder James Milner after the player expressed his desire to leave the club. He is widely tipped to sign for Manchester City, who recently had a £20 million offer for him turned down.

23 July 2010: Former Millwall, Wycombe Wanderers and Bradford City striker Gavin Grant, 26, is found guilty (along with another man) of committing murder in London in May 2004. Grant was initially cleared of the murder three years earlier but charged again when new evidence came to light.

26 July 2010: Tottenham Hotspur express interest in moving to London's Olympic Stadium after the 2012 Olympic Games. West Ham United is the only club to have officially bid for the venue so far, while Leyton Orient decided against moving.

28 July 2010: After six months back at Arsenal, former England defender Sol Campbell signs for Newcastle United on a one-year contract. This means that Campbell, 35, will be playing in the Premier League for the 19th season running. He and Ryan Giggs are the only players who have played in every single Premier League season since its inception.

29 July 2010: Mark Hughes, sacked as Manchester City manager seven months earlier, is confirmed as manager of Fulham.

30 July 2010: England goalkeeper David James signs a one-year contract with Bristol City.

August 2010
2 August 2010: Ipswich Town coach Gary Ablett, who managed Stockport County the previous season and won honours as a player with Liverpool and Everton, announces that he is suffering from non-Hodgkin's lymphoma.

9 August 2010: Aston Villa manager Martin O'Neill resigns after four years in charge, during which he guided them to UEFA Cup qualification in three successive seasons. He is replaced on a caretaker basis by Villa reserve team manager Kevin MacDonald until a permanent successor is appointed.

10 August 2010: Exeter City striker Adam Stansfield dies of cancer aged 31.

12 August 2010: Steve Coppell resigns after less than four months and just two competitive games in charge of Bristol City.

13 August 2010: Manchester City take their summer spending past £100 million with the signing of Italy and Inter Milan striker Mario Balotelli for a fee in the region of £24 million.

14 August 2010: The 19th Premier League season gets underway, with newcomers Blackpool winning their first top division game since 1971 4–0 away to Wigan Athletic. Kevin Blackwell leaves Sheffield United by mutual consent following a 3–0 loss to Queens Park Rangers, having been manager for two and a half years.

17 August 2010: Sheffield United promote coach and former player Gary Speed, aged 41, to be their new manager on a three-year contract. Chelsea striker Nicolas Anelka is suspended from the French national team's next 18 matches following a dispute with coach Raymond Domenech at the World Cup.

21 August 2010: Theo Walcott scores the first club hat-trick of his career as Arsenal defeat Blackpool 6–0 at the Emirates Stadium.

30 August 2010: Alan Pardew is sacked as manager of Southampton, League One promotion favourites and Football League Trophy holders, despite guiding them to a 4–0 away win over Bristol Rovers two days previously.

31 August 2010: August draws to a close with Chelsea top of the table with nine points out of nine, scoring fourteen goals and conceding none against West Brom, Wigan and Stoke. Arsenal and Manchester United are joint second on seven points, Arsenal ahead on goal difference following the win over Blackpool, while Aston Villa, still without a manager, are fourth, after recovering from a 6–0 thrashing at Newcastle to narrowly beat Everton 1–0. Bolton, Birmingham and Wolves complete the top seven. Propping up the table are Stoke and West Ham United, neither with a point this season, and Everton. Queens Park Rangers lead the Championship, with Cardiff City, Ipswich Town, Millwall, Burnley and Leeds United (joint sixth with Norwich City) completing the top six; Bristol City, Leicester City and Portsmouth lie in the relegation zone. In the transfer market, Sunderland confirm the transfer of Ghana striker Asamoah Gyan in a club record £13m deal whilst Tottenham began contact with Dutch midfielder Rafael van der Vaart.

September 2010
4 September 2010: Jermain Defoe scores a hat-trick as England open their Euro 2012 qualifying campaign with a 4–0 win over Bulgaria at Wembley.

8 September 2010: Aston Villa name Gérard Houllier, former Liverpool and France manager, as their successor to Martin O'Neill.

12 September 2010: Nigel Adkins leaves Scunthorpe United after four years as manager (during which they won promotion to the Championship twice) to become the new manager of Southampton.

13 September 2010: Gary McAllister, first team coach at Middlesbrough, is reported to have been offered the role of assistant manager at Aston Villa after Phil Thompson rejected the offer for the role.

18 September 2010: Gary McAllister completes his move to Aston Villa as assistant manager. Bobby Smith, who scored 208 goals for Tottenham Hotspur and helped them win the league title/FA Cup double in 1961, retain the FA Cup a year later and win the European Cup Winners' Cup in 1963, dies aged 77.

25 September 2010: The last 100% start in any of the professional divisions ends when Chelsea, who won their opening five games of the Premier League season, are beaten 1–0 at Manchester City, with Carlos Tevez scoring the only goal of the game.

30 September 2010: Despite loss at Manchester City, Chelsea still lead the Premier League by three points. Manchester United, Arsenal, Manchester City, Aston Villa, West Bromwich Albion and Fulham complete the top seven, while Wigan Athletic, West Ham United and Everton lie in the relegation zone. QPR and Cardiff lead the Championship, with Norwich, Watford, Burnley and Reading in the play-off zone and Crystal Palace, Bristol City and Leicester City in the relegation zone.

October 2010
1 October 2010: Paulo Sousa is sacked after just nine league matches in charge of Leicester City, who were bottom of the Championship having qualified for the play-offs last season under Sousa's predecessor Nigel Pearson. Manchester City announce that they made a loss of £121million in the year leading up to 31 May.

3 October 2010: Former England national football team manager Sven-Göran Eriksson is appointed manager of Leicester City on a two-year contract.

4 October 2010: Bolton Wanderers striker Kevin Davies, aged 33 and uncapped at senior level, is called up to the England squad for the following week's Euro 2012 qualifier against Montenegro.

5 October 2010: Two potential buyers, one Asian and the other American, table bids to buy control of Liverpool from American co-owners Tom Hicks and George Gillet.

8 October 2010: Liverpool directors reported to be on the verge of surrendering the club to the administrators and risk a nine-point deduction in an attempt to oust the club's unpopular owners Tom Hicks and George Gillett, as they facilitate the sale of the club to an American consortium.

10 October 2010: It is reported that Liverpool's prospective new owners are planning to abandon the plan for a new stadium in Stanley Park in favour of expanding Anfield.

11 October 2010: UK Athletics announces its support for West Ham United's bid to take over the Olympic Stadium after the 2012 Summer Olympics. Tottenham Hotspur have also expressed interest in taking over the stadium as a possible alternative to the revamp of White Hart Lane.

12 October 2010: Singapore billionaire Peter Lim becomes Liverpool's latest bidder when he tables a £320million bid for the club.

15 October 2010: Liverpool's new owners are New England Sports Ventures, who complete a £300million takeover deal of the club.

17 October 2010: In the first game under their owners, Liverpool lose the Merseyside derby 2–0 to Everton at Goodison Park.

18 October 2010: Gordon Strachan resigns after 12 months as manager of Middlesbrough, who began the season as Championship promotion favourites but now occupy 20th place.

19 October 2010: Manchester United manager Sir Alex Ferguson reveals that striker Wayne Rooney wants to leave the club, having recently decided against signing an extension to his contract which will expire at the end of next season.

22 October 2010: Wayne Rooney makes a surprise u-turn on his future and signs a new five-year contract with Manchester United. Portsmouth are reported to be on the brink of bankruptcy after talks with former owner and key creditor Sacha Gaydamak broke down.

24 October 2010: Portsmouth are saved after former owner Alexander Gaydamak agrees to sell the club to Balram Chainrai, another former owner of the club.

25 October 2010: Aston Villa will be without the services of captain Stiliyan Petrov for at least two months due to a knee injury suffered in the 1–0 league defeat by Sunderland on Saturday. Promising Wigan Athletic midfielder James McCarthy, 19, is expected to be out of action until the New Year as a result of an ankle injury suffered in Saturday's 1–1 league draw with Bolton Wanderers.

31 October 2010: Newcastle beat local rivals Sunderland 5–1 at St James' Park in the Premier League, with Kevin Nolan scoring a hat-trick – the first player to do so in a game between the two clubs since Peter Beardsley in the 1984–85 season. In the Championship, Cardiff have overtaken QPR at the top of the table, with Swansea City, Coventry City, Norwich and Reading also in the top six and Bristol City, Middlesbrough and Crystal Palace in the bottom three.

November 2010
6 November 2010: A late winning goal from Park Ji-sung gives Manchester United a 2–1 home win over Wolverhampton Wanderers in the Premier League, cutting Chelsea's lead to two points – although the West London side, who play Liverpool at Anfield tomorrow, have a game in hand. In the first round of the FA Cup, Conference South side Dover Athletic eliminate fellow Kent club Gillingham, managed by former Dover manager Andy Hessenthaler, with a 2–0 win on the League Two club's own soil.

11 November 2010: Blackpool manager Ian Holloway threatens to resign if the Football Association penalise him for fielding a weakened side in his side's 3–2 league defeat at Aston Villa yesterday evening.

13 November 2010: Fabio Capello announces his England squad for the friendly against France on 17 November. It includes first call-ups for Jay Bothroyd of Cardiff City, Andy Carroll of Newcastle United, Jordan Henderson of Sunderland and Chris Smalling of Manchester United.

14 November 2010: League One side Sheffield Wednesday are reported to be on the brink of going into administration.

16 November 2010: West Ham United vice-chairman Karren Brady announces that Avram Grant's job as manager is safe despite the club being bottom of the Premier League with just one win from their opening 13 games. Fabio Capello confirms that Andy Carroll, Jordan Henderson and Kieran Gibbs will all play in England's friendly against France.

19 November 2010: Blackburn Rovers are taken over by the Rao family in a £43million deal, making them the first Indian owned English football club.

25 November 2010: Mayor of London Boris Johnson gives the go-ahead from Tottenham Hotspur to rebuild White Hart Lane as a 56,000-seat stadium which is set to cost around £450million.

27 November 2010: In the FA Cup second round, FC United of Manchester (the club created five years ago by Manchester United fans protesting against Malcolm Glazer's takeover) hold League One leaders Brighton & Hove Albion to a 1–1 draw to force a replay.

30 November 2010: November ends with unbeaten Manchester United top of the Premier League after thrashing Blackburn 7–1 at home, with Dimitar Berbatov scoring five goals. Chelsea, having only picked up four points from their last five matches, have slipped to second, ahead of Arsenal on goal difference. Manchester City remain in fourth, with Tottenham Hotspur one point behind. Despite beating fellow strugglers Wigan Athletic, West Ham United remain bottom of the table, joined in the relegation zone by Wolverhampton Wanderers and Wigan. In the championship, Queen's Park Rangers, still unbeaten, hold a five-point lead for promotion over second placed Cardiff City, who in turn have a three-point lead over arch-rivals and third placed Swansea City. Derby County, Norwich City and Coventry City are also in the play-off zone, while Crystal Palace, Middlesbrough and Preston North End prop up the table.

December 2010
2 December 2010: England's bid to host the 2018 World Cup fails; FIFA awards the tournament to Russia instead.

6 December 2010: Newcastle United sack manager Chris Hughton after just over a year in charge.

9 December 2010: Alan Pardew is appointed manager of Newcastle United on a contract until the end of the 2015–16 season.

10 December 2010: Queen's Park Rangers suffer their first league defeat of the season when they lose 3–1 at home to Watford.

11 December 2010: Newcastle United continue to pile the pressure on Liverpool by winning 3–1 in the Premier League in their first game under the management of Alan Pardew. West Ham United fall deeper into relegation trouble with a 3–1 home defeat to Manchester City, who go level on points with Arsenal at the top of the Premier League.

12 December 2010: Manchester City captain Carlos Tevez announces his intention to leave the club. Wolverhampton Wanderers give their survival hopes a major boost with a 1–0 home win over local rivals Birmingham City. Chelsea continue to drop points as a Didier Drogba penalty miss restricts them to a 1–1 draw at Tottenham Hotspur.

13 December 2010: Blackburn Rovers sack manager Sam Allardyce, after two years in charge, following a 2–1 defeat at Bolton Wanderers. Gary Speed, the Sheffield United manager, is given permission to speak to the Welsh football association about the national team manager's job left vacant by the recent resignation of John Toshack, and is expected to be confirmed as Wales manager within the next 24 hours.

14 December 2010: Gary Speed is confirmed as the new Wales manager on a contract until July 2014.

15 December 2010: Dale Roberts, goalkeeper with Conference National side Rushden & Diamonds, dies suddenly at the age of 24.

31 December 2010: The year ends with Manchester United top of the Premier League, separated from second-placed Manchester City by goal difference. Arsenal, Chelsea, Tottenham, Bolton and Sunderland make up the rest of the top seven and Fulham, Wolves and West Ham the bottom three. In the Championship, the top three of QPR, Cardiff and Swansea remain unchanged, with Leeds, Norwich and Reading in the top six and Scunthorpe, Crystal Palace and Preston in the relegation zone.

January 2011
6 January 2011 – The Aston Villa board announce that Gérard Houllier's position as manager is safe in spite of recent results.

7 January 2011 – Roy Keane is sacked by Ipswich Town after less than two years as manager, with the Suffolk club League Cup semi-finalists but struggling the Championship.

8 January 2011: Roy Hodgson leaves Liverpool after six months as manager and is succeeded by Kenny Dalglish as caretaker manager until the end of the season. It is Dalglish's first managerial job since he left Celtic more than 10 years ago, and his return as Liverpool manager comes a month before the 20th anniversary of his sudden resignation. The FA Cup third round sees a number of upsets as League Two Burton Albion eliminate Middlesbrough 2–1 at the Pirelli Stadium. Football League newcomers Stevenage defeat mid-table Premier League side Newcastle United 3–1 and Sunderland lose 2–1 at home to League One strugglers Notts County.

9 January 2011: Kenny Dalglish's first match back in charge of Liverpool ends in a 1–0 FA Cup third round defeat at Manchester United, with a second-minute penalty by Ryan Giggs winning the game, while Liverpool's Steven Gerrard is sent off.

10 January 2011: Macclesfield Town midfielder Richard Butcher dies suddenly aged 29, just 10 months after Keith Alexander, who had brought him to the club.

12 January 2011: Ipswich Town beat Arsenal in the first leg of the League Cup semi-final 1–0 at Portman Road, three days after losing 7–0 in the FA Cup at Chelsea.

15 January 2011: Bolton Wanderers and England legend Nat Lofthouse dies aged 85.

25 January 2011: Arsenal reach the Football League Cup final with a 3–1 aggregate victory over Ipswich Town in the semi-finals.

26 January 2011: Birmingham reach the Football League Cup final with a 4–3 aggregate victory over West Ham after extra time in the semi-finals.

29 January 2011: The FA Cup fourth round sees Manchester United win 2–1 at Southampton, Bolton Wanderers and Wigan Athletic draw a blank at the Reebok Stadium Burton Albion's FA Cup dream end in a 3–1 defeat at Burnley, Crawley Town match the record FA Cup run for a Conference club by winning 1–0 at Torquay United, and Brighton & Hove Albion win 1–0 at Watford. The highlights of the league action include Norwich City's goalless draw at Crystal Palace putting them into second place in the Championship, while Walsall keep their League One survival hopes alive with a 6–1 win over fellow strugglers Bristol Rovers.

31 January 2011: Chelsea pay a British record 50 million pounds for Liverpool striker Fernando Torres. Liverpool paid 35 million pounds for Andy Carroll – breaking the transfer record for a British footballer.

February 2011
2 February 2011: Gary Neville, who has played 602 times for Manchester United since his debut in September 1992, announces his retirement from playing just before his 36th birthday. He has won a total of 14 major trophies at United, and also been capped 85 times for England, but has played just over 30 games in all competitions over the last four years following injury and competition from other players at United for the right-back position.

5 February 2011: A record-breaking day for the Premier League sees Arsenal take a 4–0 lead at Newcastle United after 26 minutes, only to concede four times after half-time to see the game end 4–4 – the first time in Premier League history that a team has been four goals ahead and still not won. Louis Saha scores four goals as Everton beat Blackpool 5–3 at Goodison Park. Carlos Tevez scores a first half hat-trick as Manchester City beat West Bromwich Albion 3–0 to boost their own title hopes and push their opponents deeper into the relegation battle. Manchester United suffer their first league defeat of the season when they are beaten 2–1 at Wolverhampton Wanderers.

6 February 2011: West Bromwich Albion sack manager Roberto Di Matteo after a season and a half in charge.

10 February 2011: West Ham United win the backing of Olympic Games bosses to take over the Olympic Stadium after the 2012 games.

11 February 2011: Roy Hodgson is appointed as manager of West Bromwich Albion.

18 February 2011: Ryan Giggs signs a new one-year contract at Manchester United, tying him to the club for at least another season and taking him into his 22nd year at Old Trafford.

21 February 2011: Plymouth Argyle issue a notice for administration, resulting in a 10-point deduction which leaves them bottom of League One and 10 points adrift of safety as their battle against a second successive relegation is made much harder.

27 February 2011: Birmingham City win the first silverware of the season, beating Arsenal 2–1 in the League Cup Final and thus ending their 48-year wait for a trophy

28 February 2011: February ends with Manchester United still top of the Premier League, four points clear of second-placed Arsenal. Manchester City, Tottenham, Chelsea, Liverpool and Bolton Wanderers complete the top seven. Wigan Athletic prop up the table with West Ham and Wolves fill the relegation zone. In the Championship, Queens Park Rangers and Swansea City remain in the automatic promotion spots. Cardiff, Norwich, Nottingham Forest and Leeds make up the play-offs, with Preston, Sheffield United and Scunthorpe in the relegation zone.

March 2011
6 March 2011: Dirk Kuyt scores a hat-trick in Liverpool's 3–1 Premier League home win over Manchester United, making him the first Liverpool player to score a competitive hat-trick against United since Peter Beardsley in September 1990. West Ham United boost their survival hopes with a 3–0 home win over Stoke City.

12 March 2011: Manchester United beat Arsenal 2–0 in the FA Cup quarter-final at Old Trafford. Bolton Wanderers win 3–2 at Birmingham City to reach their first FA Cup semi-final for 11 years.

13 March 2011: Reading, the last non-Premier League side in the FA Cup, lose 1–0 to Manchester City in the quarter final, with the winners reaching the semi-finals for the first time in 30 years. Stoke City beat West Ham United 2–1 to reach the semi-finals for the first time since 1972.

14 March 2011: Jens Lehmann, the German goalkeeper who kept goal for Arsenal from 2003 to 2008, is reported to be on the verge of coming out of retirement to act as an emergency goalkeeper for Arsenal until the end of the season to ease an injury crisis.

19 March 2011: Fabio Capello re-instates John Terry as England captain a year after he was stripped of the position following allegations about his personal life.

31 March 2011: Manchester United remain top of the Premier League, 5 points ahead of closest rivals Arsenal. Manchester City and Chelsea fill the two remaining Champions League places, whilst Tottenham, Liverpool and Bolton complete the top seven. At the bottom Birmingham City have slipped into the relegation zone barely a month after lifting the League Cup, they are joined by West-Midlands rivals Wolves and bottom club Wigan. In the Championship Queens Park Rangers continue to lead the way and have a nine-point cushion over second-placed Norwich City. Welsh rivals Swansea and Cardiff are joined in the play-off places by Leeds and Nottingham Forest, whilst at the bottom, Preston remain at the foot of the league with Scunthorpe and Sheffield United also in the relegation zone.

April 2011
2 April 2011: Manchester United move closer to the Premier League title after coming from 2–0 down at half–time to win 4–2 at West Ham United, in which Wayne Rooney scores a hat-trick. In the Championship, Yakubu scores a hat-trick for Leicester City in their 3–3 draw at Middlesbrough.

6 April 2011: Torquay United are deducted one point and Hereford United deducted three points for fielding ineligible players in the League Two game at Plainmoor on 1 February, which Hereford won 3–1.

8 April 2011: Liverpool captain Steven Gerrard is ruled out for the rest of the season with a groin injury.

9 April 2011: Crawley Town secure the Conference National title and promotion to the Football League with a 3–0 win at Tamworth.

11 April 2011: Liverpool's record signing, Andy Carroll, scores his first two goals for the club in their 3–0 home win over Manchester City in the Premier League.

12 April 2011: Manchester United reach the semi-finals of the Champions League when a 2–1 quarter-final second leg win over Chelsea at Old Trafford gives them a 3–1 aggregate triumph. Brighton and Hove Albion become the first Football League side to be promoted after they beat Dagenham & Redbridge 4–3 at home.

16 April 2011: Yaya Touré fires Manchester City to their first FA Cup final for 30 years by beating rivals Manchester United 1–0, who were reduced to 10 men after the dismissal of Paul Scholes.

17 April 2011: Stoke City reach the FA Cup final for the first time in their history with a 5–0 win over Bolton Wanderers in the other semi-final.

22 April 2011: Chesterfield become the second Football League side to win promotion this season after the last side capable of overhauling them, Wycombe Wanderers, drew 0–0 with Torquay. Blue Square Premier champions Crawley Town F.C. break the 100-point barrier with a 4–0 home win over Rushden & Diamonds, with leading scorer Matt Tubbs taking his tally for this season to 36 goals.

23 April 2011: British record signing Fernando Torres scores his first goal in thirteen appearances for Chelsea in their 3–0 home win over West Ham United.

25 April 2011: Preston North End, bottom of the Championship, lose 1–0 at home to Cardiff City and are relegated to League One after 11 successive seasons in the league's second tier. Swindon Town are relegated to League Two after losing 3–1 at Sheffield Wednesday. Bury join Chesterfield in League One as a 3–2 win at the division's leaders ends their nine-year stay in the league's basement division.

30 April 2011: Queens Park Rangers seal the Championship title and promotion to the Premier League after a 15-year exile by beating Watford 2–0 at Vicarage Road. Sheffield United are relegated to League One (a level they last played at in 1989) after they could only manage a 2–2 draw at home to Yorkshire rivals Barnsley. Scunthorpe United's relegation is also confirmed as they crash to a 5–1 defeat at a Nottingham Forest side whose victory virtually seals a playoff place. Stockport County's relegation from the Football League is confirmed by a 2–0 defeat at Crewe Alexandra.

May 2011
2 May 2011: Norwich City seal a second successive promotion to reach the Premier League by beating Portsmouth 1–0 at Fratton Park. They are the first team since Manchester City in 2000 to reach the Premier League with two successive promotions. Plymouth Argyle are relegated from League One, their second successive relegation, with a 3–1 home defeat to a Southampton side whose promotion is virtually ensured by virtue of having a vastly superior goal difference to third-placed Huddersfield, three points adrift with one game left.

7 May 2011: QPR escape points deduction, while Nottingham Forest confirm their play-off place. Southampton's promotion to the Championship is confirmed. Dagenham & Redbridge and Bristol Rovers are relegated from League One. Lincoln City's 3–0 home defeat to Aldershot costs them their Football League status and they are relegated to the Conference National. Wycombe Wanderers seal an immediate return to League One by beating Southend United 3–1 at Adams Park.

8 May 2011: Manchester United beat Chelsea 2–1 at Old Trafford in the Premier League, meaning that they need just a point from their final two games to win a record 19th top division title. Arsenal's faint title hopes are ended with a 3–1 defeat at FA Cup finalists Stoke City. Wolverhampton Wanderers climb out of the relegation zone with a 3–1 home win over Black Country rivals West Bromwich Albion, whose survival (and highest league finish since 1985) has already been confirmed.

14 May 2011: Manchester City defeat Stoke City 1–0 in the FA Cup final, with Yaya Touré scoring the only goal which ends the club's 35-year wait for a major trophy. It is a double success story on the same day for the city of Manchester, as United's 1–1 draw with Blackburn Rovers at Ewood Park confirms their status as Premier League champions – giving them a record 19th top division title. Blackpool keep their survival hopes alive with a thrilling 4–3 home win over Bolton Wanderers, while Wolverhampton Wanderers take a step further to survival with a 3–1 win at Sunderland.

15 May 2011: West Ham United lose 3–2 at Wigan Athletic, despite taking a 2–0 lead after 26 minutes, and are relegated from the Premier League after six successive seasons there. Chelsea effectively secure second place with a 2–2 draw at home to Newcastle United. Birmingham City remain on the brink of the relegation zone, with only goal difference keeping them clear, after losing 2–0 at home to a Fulham side occupying eighth place. Later that day West Ham manager Avram Grant is sacked.

21 May 2011: AFC Wimbledon beat Luton Town 4–3 on penalties following a goalless draw in the Conference play-off final. Wimbledon reach the Football League only nine years after their formation, which occurred when The FA approved the relocation of the original Wimbledon side to Milton Keynes. AFC Wimbledon and the since-renamed Milton Keynes Dons will now be just one division apart.

22 May 2011: On the final day of the Premier League, Blackpool are relegated by a 4–2 defeat at Manchester United after taking a 2–1 lead, while League Cup holders Birmingham City also go down after conceding a last minute goal as they lose 2–1 to a Tottenham Hotspur side whose victory confirms their Europa League qualification, while Blackburn Rovers beat Wolverhampton Wanderers 3–2 at Molineux, and both sides avoid relegation. Wigan Athletic win 1–0 against Stoke City and also avoid the drop. Elsewhere, Manchester City pip Arsenal to third place, and Tottenham's win over Birmingham City means that Liverpool (who lose 1–0 at Aston Villa) miss out on a place in Europe for the first time in 12 years.

28 May 2011: Stevenage are promoted to League One, beating Torquay United 1–0 in the League Two play-off final at Old Trafford.

29 May 2011: Peterborough United win promotion to the Championship, beating Huddersfield Town 3–0 in the League One play-off final at Old Trafford.

30 May 2011: Swansea City become the first Welsh club to earn promotion to the Premier League, beating Reading 4–2 in the Championship play-off final at Wembley.

June 2011
1 June 2011: Gérard Houllier steps down as Aston Villa manager by mutual consent following his illness. Also on 1 June, Convers Sports Initiatives owned by Russian Vladimir Antonov completed its takeover of Portsmouth.

2 June 2011: Mark Hughes resigned as a Fulham manager after having spent 11 months as manager.

3 June 2011: Tottenham Hotspur signed Aston Villa's goalkeeper veteran Brad Friedel on a free transfer as his contract set to expire next season. Also, Frank Arnesen's Hamburger SV signed Jacopo Sala from Chelsea, becoming a second player to join Hamburg from Chelsea this following Michael Mancienne's £1.75 million move to Germany.

6 June 2011: Millwall top scorer last season Steve Morison joined newly promoted side Norwich City for an undisclosed fee.

7 June 2011:  Newly promoted side Swansea City signed Watford's top scorer Danny Graham for £3.5 million.

8 June 2011: Arsenal make their first signing of the transfer window in Carl Jenkinson from Charlton Athletic for an undisclosed fee.

9 June 2011: Liverpool make their first signing of the transfer window in Jordan Henderson from Sunderland for £16 million.

10 June 2011: Newcastle United made their first signing Yohan Cabaye from Lille for an undisclosed fee.

13 June 2011: Manchester United made their first signing Phil Jones from Blackburn Rovers for an undisclosed fee.

23 June 2011: Manchester United sign midfielder Ashley Young from Aston Villa for an undisclosed fee.

29 June 2011: Manchester United sign Spanish goalkeeper David de Gea from Atlético Madrid for £18.9 million.

New clubs
 Bromsgrove Sporting F.C. was formed by fans of Bromsgrove Rovers before the season began and before the original club folded. They were accepted into the Midland Football Combination Division two (level 12) while the original club was expelled from the Southern League, Division One South & West (Level 8)
 Chester F.C. was formed by fans of Chester City F.C. which had folded. They were accepted into the Northern Premier League Division One North (level 8), while the original club had been expelled from the Conference National (level 5).
 Merthyr Town F.C. was formed by fans of Merthyr Tydfil F.C. which had folded. They were accepted into the Western Football League Division One (level 10), while the original club had been expelled from the Southern Football League Premier Division (level 7)

Clubs removed
 Bromsgrove Rovers, expelled from Southern League, Division One South & West (Level 8), 11 August 2010.
 Ilkeston Town, expelled from Conference North (Level 6), 8 September 2010.
 Leyton, expelled from Isthmian League, Division One North (Level 8), 14 January 2011.
 Atherstone Town, resigned from Southern League Division One Central (Level 8) at the end of the season. Announced 18 December 2010.
 Windsor & Eton, expelled from Southern League, Premier Division (Level 7), 2 February 2011.
 Windsor formed out of club's demise, and competed in the Combined Counties Football League (level 9) in 2011–12
 Almondsbury Town, resigned from Southern League, Division One South & West (Level 8) at end of season. Announced 7 April 2011.
 Leigh Genesis, resigned from North West Counties Football League (level 9) after season finished. Announced 2 June 2011.
 Rushden & Diamonds, expelled from 2011–12 Conference National (level 5) after season finished. Announced 11 June 2011.
 AFC Rushden & Diamonds formed out of club's demise and will field a senior team in 2012–13.
 Rossendale United, expelled from 2011–12 North West Counties Football League (level 9) after season finished. Announced 18 June 2011.

Retirements

 July 2010 – Chris Lumsdon, 30, former Sunderland, Barnsley, Carlisle United and Darlington midfielder.
 24 August 2010 – Sam Hutchinson, 21, former Chelsea defender.
 26 August 2010 – Matt Murray, 29, former Wolverhampton Wanderers goalkeeper.
 January 2011 – Gavin McCann, 33, former Everton, Sunderland, Aston Villa and Bolton Wanderers midfielder who won one cap for England.
 2 February 2011 – Gary Neville, 35, former England and Manchester United full back.
 5 March 2011 – Miki Roqué, 22, former Liverpool and Oldham Athletic defender.
 8 March 2011 – Chris Armstrong, 28, former Bury, Oldham Athletic, Sheffield United and Reading defender.
 10 March 2011 – Sean McDaid, 25, former Doncaster Rovers and Carlisle United defender.
 29 April 2011 – Michael Bridges, 32, former Sunderland, Leeds United, Bristol City, Carlisle United, Hull City and MK Dons striker.
 22 May 2011 – Jerzy Dudek, 38, former Poland and Liverpool goalkeeper.
 30 May 2011 – Claude Makélélé, 38, former France and Chelsea midfielder.
 31 May 2011 – Paul Scholes, 36, former England and Manchester United midfielder. 
 6 June 2011 – Jon Dahl Tomasson, 34, former Denmark and Newcastle United striker.
 Summer 2011 – Edwin van der Sar, 40, former Netherlands, Fulham and Manchester United goalkeeper.
 Summer 2011 – Sami Hyypiä, 37, former Finland and Liverpool defender.
 Summer 2011 – Robbie Savage, 36, former Wales, Crewe Alexandra, Leicester City, Birmingham City, Blackburn Rovers and Derby County midfielder.
 Summer 2011 – Paul Hartley, 34, former Scotland, Millwall and Bristol City midfielder.
 Summer 2011 – Tony Roberts, 41, former Dagenham & Redbridge, QPR & Wales goalkeeper.

Deaths
 14 July 2010 – Ken Barnes, 81, wing-half who made 283 appearances for Manchester City, and was a member of the City side that won the FA Cup in 1956. Later became manager of Wrexham before returning to City as chief scout
 17 July 2010 – Shaun Mawer, 50, full back who made 60 appearances for Grimsby Town from 1977 to 1980
 30 July 2010 – Stanley Milburn, 83, played for Ashington, Chesterfield, Leicester City and Rochdale and had one England B team cap. Uncle of Jack and Bobby Charlton.
 10 August 2010 – Brian Clark, 67, forward who made over 600 appearances in The Football League, most notably with Cardiff City and Bristol City.
 10 August 2010 – Adam Stansfield, 31, Exeter City forward who made over 300 career appearances for Yeovil Town, Hereford United and Exeter City.
 10 August 2010 – Markus Liebherr, 62, owner of Southampton F.C.
 15 August 2010 – John Green, 71, midfielder who made 250 league appearances for Tranmere Rovers, Blackpool and Port Vale.
 18 September 2010 – Bobby Smith, 77, who was a key member of Tottenham Hotspur's double winning side of 1961 .
 1 October 2010 – Ian Buxton, 72, inside-forward who made 215 league appearances for Derby County, Luton Town, Notts County and Port Vale; also a captain of Derbyshire County Cricket Club.
 13 October 2010 – Eddie Baily, 85, inside-forward who made 419 league appearances for Tottenham Hotspur, Port Vale, Nottingham Forest, and Leyton Orient, and the England national team; part of the Spurs 1950–51 League winning side.
 15 October 2010 – Malcolm Allison, 83, best remembered for his spell as coach under Joe Mercer at Manchester City during the successes of the late 1960s and early 1970s, and for his later but less successful spell as the club's manager.
 29 October 2010 – Ronnie Clayton, 76, Right-half who made 35 appearances England, many as the skipper. Clayton was one of the most recognised wing-halves of his generation, during his 21-year career from 1950 to 1971, he spent 19 years at Blackburn Rovers.
 30 October 2010 – John Benson, 67, Scottish football player and manager. Notably playing for Torquay United in the 60's, and for managing and directing Wigan Athletic.
 14 December 2010 – Dale Roberts, 24, former Nottingham Forest goalkeeper playing for Conference National team Rushden & Diamonds. Roberts also featured for the England C team. His death was a suspected suicide.
 17 December 2010 – Ralph Coates, 64, former Burnley, Tottenham Hotspur, Leyton Orient and England forward.
 28 December 2010 – Avi Cohen, 54, former Liverpool defender who scored the club's title-clinching goal in 1980. Was also a captain of the Israel national football team. Died from injuries sustained in a motorcycling accident in his native Israel.
 10 January 2011 – Richard Butcher, 29, Macclesfield Town midfielder, who also enjoyed spells with Northampton Town, Kettering Town, Oldham Athletic, Peterborough United, Notts County and Lincoln City.
 15 January 2011 – Nat Lofthouse, 85, spent his entire career at Bolton Wanderers as a striker, scoring 285 goals in 503 appearances from 1946 to 1960, along with scoring 30 goals in 33 appearances for England.
 26 January 2011 – David Knowles, 69, former Bradford City goalkeeper.
 3 February 2011 – Neil Young, 66, former Manchester City striker.
 20 February 2011 – Tony Kellow, 58, former Exeter City, Blackpool, Plymouth Argyle, Swansea and Newport County striker.
 26 February 2011 – Dean Richards, 36, former Tottenham and Wolves defender.
 23 March 2011 – Trevor Storton, 61, former Tranmere Rovers, Liverpool and Chester City defender.

Honours

Trophy and League Champions

Playoff Winners

League tables

Premier League

Manchester United won their 12th Premier League title and their 19th championship overall, beating Liverpool's record of 18 championships set in 1990. A late surge consigned Chelsea to a second-place finish; their season fell apart following the departure of first-team coach Ray Wilkins in early November and this coincided with a horrendous run of form in the winter as they picked up just 10 points from 11 games, with manager Carlo Ancelotti losing his job on the final day. Arsenal qualified for the Champions League in 4th, having been realistic outsiders for the league title until losing the League Cup final, at which point they won just two of their last 11 league games, falling behind 3rd placed Manchester City, who entered Europe's elite competition for the first time after overturning a 5-point deficit with 3 games left. Tottenham settled for the Europa League spot, though they had an impressive first Champions League run that took them to the quarterfinals. Liverpool – who managed to put a terrible League start under Roy Hodgson behind them – seemed as if they were going to finish 5th under Kenny Dalglish, but lost their last two games and had to settle for 6th. This meant that they failed to qualify for any European competition for the first time in 12 years. Merseyside rivals Everton finished immediately behind them in seventh place, after a much improved second half of the campaign.

Fulham rose up the table to finish eighth, and qualify for the Europa League via the Fair Play League. Stoke also qualified for the Europa League by reaching their first ever FA Cup Final, despite losing by a single goal to eventual winners Manchester City. Martin O'Neill, just days before the campaign began, resigned from his position as Aston Villa manager. This hit Villa immensely and they found themselves in a relegation battle for much of the season, despite the efforts of former Liverpool manager Gérard Houllier. They confirmed survival with a 9th-place finish, but only after Houllier took a leave of absence following a heart scare with a few weeks to go.

Newly promoted West Bromwich Albion and Newcastle United also enjoyed decent finishes, in eleventh and twelfth places respectively. Albion began the season well under Roberto di Matteo until a loss in form saw them fall down the table. With Albion just above the drop zone, the Italian was replaced by Roy Hodgson, who recovered from his disappointing Liverpool tenure to steer the Baggies away from relegation trouble. Newcastle's twelfth place was achieved despite the surprise sacking of Chris Hughton, who was replaced by Alan Pardew, and the departure of striker Andy Carroll to Liverpool for £35 million in January.

West Ham United were the first team to go down, despite the efforts of their star midfielder Scott Parker (who won the Footballer of the Year Award); the Hammers' relegation was confirmed following a 3–2 defeat at Wigan. Blackpool returned to the Championship after a run of only three wins from their last 21 games, despite a league double over Liverpool. Despite winning the Football League Cup (and thereby qualifying for the following season's Europa League), Birmingham were relegated on the last day after they suffered a late season slump in form, enabling close rivals Wolves, as well as Blackburn and Wigan, to survive in one of the top-flight's tightest relegation battles.

Leading goalscorers: Dimitar Berbatov (Manchester United) and Carlos Tevez (Manchester City) – 21

Football League Championship

Queens Park Rangers won the Championship and returned to the Premier League after a fifteen-year absence. Neil Warnock became the first manager in six years to complete a full season in charge with the club, and equalled the record for the most promotions ever won by a single manager. The runners-up spot was taken by Norwich City, who earned their second successive promotion under Paul Lambert and became only the third English club to achieve back to back promotions to the top flight, and the first since Manchester City 11 years previous. Swansea City were promoted via the play-offs after beating Reading in the play-off final, becoming the first Welsh club ever to play in the Premier League. Ironically, Swansea manager Brendan Rodgers was a former manager of Reading, having been sacked by the Royals midway through the previous season.

None of the three teams relegated from the Premier League in the previous season were able to mount a challenge for promotion. Burnley, whom many tipped for an immediate return to the top flight, ultimately fell just short of the top six, but the efforts of Hull City and Portsmouth were hindered by respective financial constraints. Cardiff City were the league's biggest chokers as they threw away their chances of automatic promotion in shocking fashion, amid reports of several players seen out drinking in the early hours before a crucial game against Middlesbrough, meaning they had to settle for the play-offs. Dave Jones was sacked at the end of May after they were crushed by losing play-off finalists Reading.

Scunthorpe United were unable to escape relegation for the second year in a row and were relegated in bottom place, despite the arrival of Alan Knill, ultimately unable to compete with teams operating on much higher financial resources. Sheffield United were relegated only a year after their cross-city counterparts, meaning that the Steel City derby would now be taking place in the third tier for the first time since 1980, the sacking of Kevin Blackwell after just two games and subsequent managerial instability proving their downfall. The third relegated club was Preston North End, who had been the longest-serving members of the Championship, having been in the division since 2000. Much like Sheffield United, their decision to replace manager Darren Ferguson backfired on them.

Leading goalscorer Danny Graham (Watford) – 24

Football League One

Brighton and Hove Albion gave their old Withdean Stadium a memorable send-off as they dominated the division for nearly the whole season and won the League One title, ensuring that the new Falmer Stadium would open to Championship football. Fellow south coast club Southampton, whose promotion challenge had been derailed by a ten-point administration penalty in the previous season, were promoted at the second time of asking, finishing as runners-up. At first, they didn't look like promotion chasers when Alan Pardew was sacked in early September and replaced by Nigel Adkins. But Adkins gave Saints fans what they wanted for years; attacking football and a 2nd-place finish. Peterborough United, who were the top scorers in any of the top four divisions, won the play-offs and clinched an immediate return to the Championship after the previous year's relegation. It meant that manager Darren Ferguson – who had left the Posh 2 years ago – had achieved his third successive promotion with the club.

Swindon Town suffered a shock relegation: having been runners-up in the play-off final the previous season, they struggled for the entire campaign and were eventually relegated in bottom place after the departures of strike-duo Billy Paynter and Charlie Austin. Plymouth Argyle suffered their second successive relegation, the loss of ten points for entering administration proving fatal. Bristol Rovers, who had been promoted alongside Swindon in 2007, were relegated with them this year. Dagenham & Redbridge battled until the final day of the season, but ultimately suffered relegation in their first-ever season at this level. Coincidentally, had it not been for Plymouth's points deduction then Walsall would have been relegated, meaning that three of the four clubs promoted from League Two at the end of the 2006–07 season would have gone down together.

Leading goalscorer: Craig Mackail-Smith (Peterborough United) – 27

Football League Two

Chesterfield enjoyed a dream start to life at their new stadium, winning the title. Runners-up were Bury, who had been in impressive form for most of the season and secured second place with a blistering late run of form under new manager Richard Barker, even threatening to overtake Chesterfield in the final weeks of the season. Wycombe Wanderers were the final automatically promoted team, making an immediate return to League One after being relegated the previous season. Stevenage won the play-offs and earned promotion in their first ever Football League season.

Stockport suffered their second successive relegation, with continued financial problems and the worst defensive record in the whole Football League costing them dearly. Barnet escaped relegation on the last day of the season with a 1–0 win over Port Vale at Underhill, and along with Lincoln City losing 3–0 to Aldershot, condemned Lincoln to their second relegation from the Football League. They had looked safe with two months to go, but an appalling run, with only two points gained from their last eleven matches saw them dumped into the relegation zone on the last day (their first relegation from the League in 1987 occurred under nearly identical circumstances).

Promoted from the Football Conference as champions were Crawley Town, who entered the Football League for the first time in their history. Also promoted (via the play-offs) were AFC Wimbledon, who were technically also newcomers to the League, but widely seen as the continuation of the original Wimbledon, who became the Milton Keynes Dons at the start of the 2004–05 season.

Leading goalscorer: Clayton Donaldson (Crewe Alexandra) – 28

England national football team

Euro 2012 qualification 

During the season, the England national football team played the first five of their eight scheduled Group G qualifying matches for Euro 2012.

Friendlies
England also participated in a number of friendly matches.

English clubs' performance in Europe
These are the results of the English teams in European competitions during the 2010–11 season. (English team score displayed first)

* For group games in Champions League or Europa League, score in home game is displayed
** For group games in Champions League or Europa League, score in away game is displayed

References